The gandingan a kayo (translated means, “wooden gandingan,” or “gandingan made of wood”) is a Philippine xylophone and considered the wooden version of the real gandingan. This instrument is a relatively new instrument coming of age due to the increasing popularity of the “wooden kulintang ensemble”. Unlike the original gandingan, the gandingan a kayo cannot be used for long-distance communication.

References

See also
Xylophone

Philippine musical instruments
Keyboard percussion instruments
Stick percussion idiophones
Gandingan